Christopher John Hays (12 December 1918 – 23 February 1983) was an English association footballer who played as a winger.

References

1918 births
1983 deaths
Sportspeople from Ashington
Footballers from Northumberland
English footballers
Association football midfielders
Bradford (Park Avenue) A.F.C. players
Burnley F.C. players
Bury F.C. players
English Football League players